Romanticismo is a 1949 Italian historical melodrama film directed by Clemente Fracassi.The film is set in Milan in 1858 and involves a Dr. Antonio Ansperti from Como, implicated in the activities of the Young Italy revolutionary movement.

Cast
Clara Calamai as Giuditta Ansperti
Nyta Dover as Mrs. Dollman
Harry Feist as Varzis, officer
Fulvia Franco as Mrs. Pochini
Olga Vittoria Gentilli as Countess Lamberti
Fosco Giachetti as Tito Ansperti
Enrico Glori as Baraffini
Tamara Lees as Anna
Paul Muller
Amedeo Nazzari	as Vitaliano Lamberti
Filippo Scelzo as General Rienz

External links
 

1949 films
1940s Italian-language films
1949 drama films
Italian historical drama films
1940s historical drama films
Italian black-and-white films
1940s Italian films